New Orleans Marriott, located at 555 Canal Street in the Central Business District of New Orleans, Louisiana, is a 42-story, -tall skyscraper. The Marriott is the seventh tallest building in New Orleans. Millionaire alleged murderer Robert Durst had been staying at the hotel when he was arrested by FBI agents on March 14, 2015.

See also
 List of tallest buildings in New Orleans
 List of tallest buildings in Louisiana

References

External links
 New Orleans Marriott (official website)

Hotels in New Orleans
Skyscraper hotels in New Orleans
Hotel buildings completed in 1972